Luton v Lessels (2002) 165 CLR 462 is a High Court of Australia case that affirms previous High Court definitions of a tax.

Facts

The Commonwealth established a Child Support scheme where a non-custodial parent was required to pay an amount of their income to the custodial parent to assist in the costs of raising their children. This scheme was established by the Child Support (Registration and Collection) Act 1988 and the Child Support (Assessment) Act 1989.

Luton, a non-custodial parent challenged the scheme on the grounds that the payment was a form of tax because it was collected by the government, and section 55 of the constitution mandates that tax legislation must deal with matters of taxation only.

Luton also claimed the Child Support Scheme conferred judicial powers on non-judicial officers. Thus, the legislation was contrary to Chapter III of the Constitution because it offended the doctrine of separation of powers.

Decision

The High Court unanimously held that the payment of child support was not a tax. Although the government collected the money, it was merely facilitating a necessary transfer of money between private citizens. It provided a mechanism for this exchange of an existing private obligation.

See also

 Constitutional basis of taxation in Australia
 Australian constitutional law

References

 Winterton, G. et al. Australian federal constitutional law: commentary and materials, 1999. LBC Information Services, Sydney.

High Court of Australia cases
2002 in Australian law
Australian constitutional law
Taxation in the Australian Constitution cases
2002 in case law